ŽORK Jagodina is a women's handball club from Jagodina, Serbia. Currently, ŽORK Jagodina competes in the Handball League of Serbia and the Women's EHF European Cup.

Kits

Honours  
National Championships :
 Winners (4) : 2018, 2019, 2020, 2021, 2022
 Runners-up (5) : 2011, 2012, 2013, 2014, 2015
 KUP Srbije (3) : 1993, 2014, 2020
 Super Kup (1) : 2020

Current squad 

Squad for the 2022–23 season

Goalkeepers
 1  Anđela Radijović
 12  Petra Hlogyak
 16  Jelena Đurašinović
Wingers
RW
 7  Srna Sukur
 10  Dunja Radević
LW 
 2  Aneta Adžić
 17  Isidora Bugonivić
 18  Petra Stojanović
Line Players 
 6  Nikoleta Pejović
 15  Katarina Bojicić

Back players
LB
 5  Tijana Simatović
 8  Anđela Nišavić
 13  Ana Marković
 20  Ivana Mitrović
CB 
 4  Marija Kojčić
 9  Sara Gugac
 11  Jelena Bulatović

References

External links
 

Serbian handball clubs
Sport in Jagodina